Lamprima imberbis is a species of beetle in the family Lucanidae; for much of its history it was treated as a synonym of Lamprima aurata, but was restored to independent status in 2018. 

Of the five species in the genus Lamprima, only two occur on the Australian mainland: L. aurata and L. imberbis. The former is widely distributed, while imberbis is restricted to northeastern New South Wales.

References

Beetles of Australia
Beetles described in 1926
Lampriminae